Gangsta Bitch Music, Vol. 2 is the second mixtape by American rapper Cardi B. It was the follow up mixtape to her debut mixtape, Gangsta Bitch Music, Vol. 1. It was released on January 20, 2017, by KSR.

Accolades

Track listing

Charts

Notes

References

2017 mixtape albums
Cardi B albums
Albums produced by J. White Did It
Sequel albums